Sunwapta is a Nakoda (Stoney) word meaning "turbulent river" or "radiating waves", and may refer to the following features in Alberta, Canada:

 Sunwapta Falls
 Sunwapta Pass
 Sunwapta Peak
 Sunwapta River
 Sunwapta Industrial, in Edmonton, see List of neighbourhoods in Edmonton#Industrial districts